HMAS Stirling is a Royal Australian Navy (RAN) base that is part of Fleet Base West situated on the west coast of Australia, on the Indian Ocean. The base is located on Garden Island in the state of Western Australia, near the city of Perth. Garden Island also has its own military airport on the island . HMAS Stirling is currently under the command of Captain Gary Lawton.

History
HMAS Stirling is named after Admiral Sir James Stirling (28 January 1791 – 23 April 1865). Stirling, a Royal Navy officer and colonial administrator, landed on Garden Island, Western Australia in 1827 and returned as commander of the barque Parmelia in June 1829 to establish and administer the Swan River Colony in Western Australia. He was the first Governor of Western Australia, serving between 1828 and 1838.

The planning of Stirling began in 1969 when, after it was decided to create the Two-Ocean Policy, a feasibility study into the use of Garden Island as a naval base was begun. The  causeway linking the island with the mainland was completed in June 1973. Construction of the wharves and workshops began in early 1973 and accommodation in 1975 with the facility, including the new Fleet Base West, being formally commissioned on 28 July 1978.

The first major unit to call Fleet Base West home was HMAS Stuart, having first been assigned to Stirling in 1984 for several years and, after refitting in the east, again in 1988 until decommissioning in 1991. The first submarine to be based at Stirling was HMAS Oxley in 1987. Later, the headquarters of the Australian Submarine Squadron was relocated there in 1994.

Stirling has expanded significantly within its existing boundaries and is the largest of the RAN's shore establishment, with a base population of approximately 2,300 service personnel, 600 defence civilians and 500 contractors. Amenities included berthing and wharves, vessel repair and refit services, a ship-lift, and a helicopter support facility, as well as medical facilities, fuel storage and accommodation. The base also hosts the Submarine Escape Training Facility – one of only six in the world and the only one in the Southern Hemisphere.

Garden Island

The remaining portion of the Island is nature reserve, the navy has been active in the removal of introduced flora and fauna species. The island has its own quarantine conditions, which prohibit bringing of plants and animals to the island.

Submarine Rotational Forces
In March 2023, the US, UK and Australia announced the Submarine Rotational Forces-West (SRF-W) initiative whereby the US and UK would maintain a permanent rotational presence of submarines at the base in support of the AUKUS submarine pact.

Ships stationed 

Stirling is home port to 11 fleet units, including six Anzac class frigates, all six of the Collins class submarines operated by the Royal Australian Navy Submarine Service, and a replenishment vessel.

See also
 List of airports in Western Australia
List of Royal Australian Navy bases
 CETO Perth Wave Energy Project

References

External links

 Globalsecurity.org profile

Royal Australian Navy bases
Airports in Western Australia
Cockburn Sound
Military installations established in 1978
1978 establishments in Australia
Buildings and structures in Perth, Western Australia
Military installations in Western Australia